Adjutant James Alexander Connelly Jr. (15 June 1894 – 1 February 1944) was a World War I flying ace credited with seven aerial victories.

Biography
Connelly was born in Marion, Pennsylvania and joined the 1st Regiment of the French Foreign Legion in 1917. He transferred to the Aviation Service within the aegis of the Lafayette Flying Corps and gained his Military Flying Brevet, No. 9711 on 3 November. Assigned to Spa157 on 15 January 1918, he gained two victories before going to Spa163 on 27 June. With this unit he scored five more victories between 27 June and the end of the war.

With the French Air Service he received the Médaille militaire and Croix de Guerre (4 Palms), and from the Air Service, United States Army, the Distinguished Service Cross.

Post-war he was a businessman in Philadelphia. In 1925, he married Elizabeth Atterbury, daughter of railway magnate General William Wallace Atterbury. He died in Bryn Mawr, Pennsylvania on 1 February 1944.

Honors and awards
 Distinguished Service Cross (DSC), Action Date: 6 September 1918
 The President of the United States of America, authorized by Act of Congress, July 9, 1918, takes pleasure in presenting the Distinguished Service Cross to Sergeant James A. Connelly, French Air Service, for extraordinary heroism in action while serving with Lafayette Escadrille, French Air Service, near Suippes, France, 6 September 1918. An American pilot, serving with the French Army, Sergeant-pilot Connelly attacked a formation of twelve enemy planes (Fokker type), shooting down the Flight Commander and forcing the remainder to seek safety. He continued with the unequal combat until his ammunition was exhausted. General Orders: War Department, General Orders No. 50 (1919)

 Médaille militaire Citation (France)
 Voluntarily enlisted for the duration of the war, he became indispensable by greatness of his character, his qualities as a pilot, and his complete contempt for danger. On 6 September 1918, he reported his fifth victory by downing an enemy scout. Three Citations

 Croix de Guerre (France)

See also

 List of World War I flying aces from the United States

References

External links
 (fr) List of victories, color profile of his plane

1894 births
1944 deaths
Soldiers of the French Foreign Legion
American World War I flying aces
Recipients of the Distinguished Service Cross (United States)
Recipients of the Croix de Guerre 1914–1918 (France)